There to Here is the debut album by Fugazi bassist Joe Lally. Released in 2006 on Dischord, the album marks a departure from the post-hardcore sound pioneered by Fugazi, to a more sparse musical style.

Track listing
 "Reason to Believe" - 3:26
 "The Resigned" - 4:14
 "Sons and Daughters" - 1:22
 "Like a Baby" - 1:44
 "Lidia's Song" - 2:42
 "Billiards" - 3:16
 "X-Ray the Lullaby" - 3:28
 "There to Here" - 4:28
 "Pick a War" - 3:14
 "Message From Earth" - 1:28
 "Factory Warranty" - 3:58
 "Perforated Line" - 3:34
 "All Must Pay" - 4:27

Personnel
Joe Lally – bass, vocals
Ian MacKaye – guitar, backing vocals
Guy Picciotto – guitar, recorder
Amy Farina – drums
Jerry Busher – drums
 Danny Frankel - drums
 Jason Kourkounis - Drums
 Eddie Janney - guitar
 Scott Weinrich - guitar

References

2006 debut albums
Joe Lally albums